Devi Dutt Sharma (born 23 October 1924) is an Indian scholar and writer of Dogri literature, best known for his writings on Himalayan dialects, culture and ethnic history. The Government of India honored Sharma in 2011, with the fourth highest civilian award of Padma Shri.

Biography
Devi Dutt Sharma was born on 23 October 1924 in the  Nanital Kumaon district of the Indian state of Uttarakhand. After passing his master's degree (MA) from Agra University, he secured two doctoral degrees, a PhD from Banares Hindu University and a DLitt from Panjab University, Chandigarh. He is credited with 28 books, 200 research papers and contributions to 56 research volumes. and is best known for his eight volume work, Socio-Cultural History of Uttarakhand. He has completed a three volume encyclopedia, Gyan Kosh which is awaiting publication.

A former Sanskrit professor of Panjab University, Chandigarh, Sharma has been honored with several awards such as the Life Time Achievement Award by the Garhwal University, Srinagar. All India Vidvat Samman by the Gyan Kalyan Datvya Nyas, New Delhi, Sanskrit Vidvat Samman (1999) by the Sampurnanand Sanskrit University, International Man of the Millennium Award (2000) from the International Biographical Centre, Cambridge, UK, Millenium Sanskrit Samman (2001) by the Government of India, and the Certificate of Honour (2001) from the President of India. In 2011, the Government of India included Sharma in the Republic day honours for the award of Padma Shri.

References

Further reading
 
 
 

People from Nainital district
Living people
Recipients of the Padma Shri in literature & education
Scholars from Uttar Pradesh
Indian Sanskrit scholars
1924 births
Banaras Hindu University alumni
Panjab University alumni
20th-century Indian linguists